The 2020–21 Super League 2 was the second season of the Super League 2, the second-tier Greek professional league for association football clubs, since restructuring of the Greek football league system. 

Season's start has been delayed due to the COVID-19 second lockdown in Greece that began in November 2020 and started on 16 January 2021.

Team changes
The following teams have changed division since the 2019–20 season.

Promoted from Gamma Ethniki
 Diagoras Rodos
 Ierapetra
 Ionikos
 Trikala

Relegated from Super League
 Xanthi

From Super League Greece 2
Promoted to Super League
 Apollon Smyrnis
 PAS Giannina

Relegated to Football League
 Apollon Pontus

Relegated to Gamma Ethniki
 Kerkyra
 Platanias

Teams

The following 12 clubs are competing in the Super League 2 during the 2020–21 season.

Personnel and sponsoring

League table

Results

Play-off round 

The top six teams from Regular season will meet once (5 matches per team) for places in 2021–22 Super League Greece as well as deciding the league champion.

Play-out round

Top scorers

References

2
Second level Greek football league seasons
Greece
Greece 2